Athabaska was a federal electoral district Alberta, Canada, that was represented in the House of Commons of Canada from 1925 to 1968.

History
This riding was created as "Athabaska" in 1924 from parts of Battle River, Edmonton East and Edmonton West ridings. 

Its first election was poorly conducted with many election irregularities. The culprits, two Edmonton lawyers, barely avoided criminal prosecution. 

The riding was abolished in 1966 when it was redistributed into Athabasca, Peace River and Vegreville ridings.

Members of Parliament

This riding has elected the following members of the House of Commons of Canada:

Election results

† Joseph McCrae Newman ran under the Technocrat party banner.

1958 election

1962 election

1963 election

1965 election

See also 

 List of Canadian federal electoral districts
 Past Canadian electoral districts

References

Further reading

External links 
 

Former federal electoral districts of Alberta